Oseam is a 1990 South Korean movie directed by Park Chul-soo. It tells the story of two orphans based on a legend in which a five-year-old boy sacrificed himself to open his blinded sister's eyes. The general theme deals with reconciliation between Buddhism and Catholicism.

See also
Cinema of Korea
Contemporary culture of South Korea
List of Korean-language films

References

External links

오세암  Ose-am Temple, 1990 at Cine21 

1990 films
1990s Korean-language films
South Korean drama films
Films directed by Park Chul-soo